Clontibret O'Neills Gaelic Athletic Association is a Gaelic football, hurling, camogie and ladies' Gaelic football club based in Clontibret, County Monaghan, Ireland.

History

A team existed in the area, named after Hugh O'Neill, Earl of Tyrone in 1896. In 1906, variously called Clontibret O'Neills or Doohamlet O'Neills, another team is recorded. The current team is considered to derive from a 1913 affiliation to the Monaghan county board.

Clontibret have won 17 county senior titles; their best finish in the Ulster Senior Club Football Championship came in 1994, when they reached the final, losing to Bellaghy.

Notable players
Vinny Corey
Packie McCully
Conor McManus
Dessie Mone
John Paul Mone
Rory Mone

Honours

Gaelic football
Monaghan Senior Football Championship (17): 1949, 1950, 1951, 1952, 1955, 1956, 1958, 1968, 1994, 1997, 2002, 2006, 2007, 2009, 2010, 2014, 2019	
Monaghan Senior Football League (13): 1950, 1954, 1955, 1957, 1964, 1966, 1992, 1997, 1998, 2002, 2005, 2007, 2011	
Monaghan Junior Football Championship (1): 1947
Monaghan Minor Football Championship (9): 1963, 1991, 1995, 1997, 2000, 2001, 2002, 2005 (as Saint Colmans, an amalgamation with Cremartin Shamrocks), 2010	
Ulster Minor Club Football Championship (1): 2002

Hurling
Monaghan Senior Hurling Championship (17): 1966, 1969, 1970, 1973, 1978, 1980, 1981, 1982, 1983, 1984, 1985, 1986, 1987, 1990, 1991, 1997, 2003
Monaghan Junior Championship (1): 2020

References

External link
Official page

Gaelic games clubs in County Monaghan
Gaelic football clubs in County Monaghan